Mount Light is a locality located within the Naracoorte Lucindale Council in the Limestone Coast region of South Australia.

Mount Light boundaries span the Riddoch Highway and Langkoop Road (Naracoorte–Casterton Road) immediately southeast of Naracoorte. The locality has no built-up or commercial area anywhere in its boundaries.

References

Limestone Coast